{{safesubst:#invoke:RfD|||month = March
|day = 20
|year = 2023
|time = 19:08
|timestamp = 20230320190829

|content=
redirect Alu Kurumba language

}}